The 1933 Cork Intermediate Hurling Championship was the 24th staging of the Cork Intermediate Hurling Championship since its establishment by the Cork County Board in 1909.

Lough Rovers won the championship following a 5-03 to 2-01 defeat of Bride Rovers in the final. This was their first championship title in the grade.

Results

Final

References

Cork Intermediate Hurling Championship
Cork Intermediate Hurling Championship